The Orchestra is a rock band formed by former members of the Electric Light Orchestra and ELO Part II. It is the continuation of ELO Part II following Bev Bevan's departure and selling of his share in the rights to the ELO name to Jeff Lynne.

History

Formation

By 2000 Bev Bevan decided to quit ELO Part II and sold his 50 percent share of the Electric Light Orchestra name as well as the rights to the ELO Part II name to Jeff Lynne. Lynne thereby became the full owner of the ELO name, and took legal action to prevent Mik Kaminski, Louis Clark, Parthenon Huxley, Eric Troyer and Kelly Groucutt from continuing to call themselves "ELO Part II". They initially tried to alter their name to "ELO2", and "Electric Light Orchestra", but they eventually decided to change their name to The Orchestra, chosen due to its similarity to the name of the band Kelly Groucutt had in the late 1980s and early 1990s with Hugh McDowell and Kaminski, called OrKestra.

No Rewind
In 2001 The Orchestra released a limited number of their CD No Rewind which was produced and first released without involvement from a major record label . With the release of the album, The Orchestra temporarily worked some original material into their live set, with "Jewel & Johnny" and the album's title song becoming occasional staples, although a vast majority of the songs they perform in concert are covers of Jeff Lynne's compositions that originally appeared on ELO's original albums between 1971 and 1986. The band continued to tour playing shows in Chile, Argentina, the UK, Eastern Europe and elsewhere around the world.

No Rewind was subsequently released in Argentina by Art Music in 2005 and reissued worldwide in 2006. The Orchestra toured the UK extensively in 2006 following the re-issue while being promoted using the descriptive phrase "Electric Light Orchestra Part II Former Members". Lynne sued The Orchestra, claiming trademark infringement. The matter went to litigation and in August 2006, a Los Angeles judge ruled in favour of the members of The Orchestra.

During The Orchestra's 2006 UK tour, Phil Bates, formerly a member of Trickster, ELO Part II and Bev Bevan's Move, stood in for Parthenon Huxley at a couple of gigs when Huxley had to return unexpectedly to the States to attend the funeral of his father. In July 2007 Huxley left the band to spend more time with his family and was replaced by Bates.

Later years
In 2008 The Orchestra participated in the Sweden Rock Festival.  A short East and Central European tour followed from mid-November taking in Latvia, Lithuania, Czech Republic, Poland and finally Kosice, Slovakia on 1 December 2008.

On 18 February 2009 the group returned from a sell out concert in Berlin. But a few hours after returning home, Kelly Groucutt suffered a heart attack and died the following day. The band decided to carry on and brought in former Styx man Glen Burtnik on bass (Burtnik had filled in for Groucutt previously during a 1998 ELO Part II tour when the latter had taken ill). On 17 July 2009 they opened for the Alan Parsons Live Project at DTE Theater in Clarkston, Michigan. German bassist Ralf Vornberger also played with the band in 2009 in Israel when Burtnik was unavailable due to other work commitments booked before he joined the band.

In November 2011 guitarist Phil Bates left The Orchestra, and Parthenon Huxley reclaimed his position as guitarist/singer. With Huxley, The Orchestra ended 2011 with a 17-city tour of Eastern and Central Europe, including stops in Russia, Ukraine, Belarus, Poland, Lithuania and the Czech Republic. In 2013 The Orchestra performed 35 shows around the world including a national telethon for children's healthcare in Ecuador. 2014 saw the band tour extensively across America, performing with the likes of Deep Purple and John Fogerty.  The Orchestra also starred on the 2014 Moody Blues Cruise alongside the Moody Blues, Roger Daltrey, Zombies and other notable acts. The group once again set out on tour in the fall of 2015.

A documentary of their evolution as a band, "No Rewind", was filmed at Full Sail University in Winter Park, Florida in 2016, and screened for the first time at the Rivertown Film Festival in Clinton, New Jersey in November, 2017.

Members

Current
Eric Troyer – keyboards, vocals, guitar (2000–present) (from ELO Part II)
Mik Kaminski – violin (2000–present) (from the fourth and fifth lineups of ELO and ELO Part II)
Gordon Townsend – drums (2000–present)
Parthenon Huxley – guitar, vocals (2000–2007 and 2011–present) (from the final lineup of ELO Part II)
Glen Burtnik – bass guitar, vocals (2009–present) (from one of the 1980s and one of the 1990s lineups of Styx and the non-Broadway cast of Beatlemania)
Louis Clark Jr. – keyboards, conductor and electric cello (2011–present)
Cliff Hillis - bass, acoustic guitar, and vocals (2017-present)

Former
Kelly Groucutt – bass guitar, vocals (2000–2009) (died 2009) (from the fifth and sixth lineups of ELO and ELO Part II)
Phil Bates – guitar, vocals (2007-2011) (from the third lineup of ELO Part II)
Louis Clark – keyboards, orchestral arranger and conductor (2000–2021) (died 2021) (ELO Orchestral arranger and conductor 1974-1983 and keyboards 1981-1986)

Live line-up history

Timeline

Discography 
Studio albums
No Rewind (2001)

Live albums
The Orchestra Live (2008)

Videos
Live in Reno (DVD), (2006)

Compilation albums
Anthology – 20 Years and Counting... (2009)

References

External links
The Orchestra official website

Electric Light Orchestra
Musical groups established in 2000
English rock music groups